Heini Lautala (born August 28, 1977, in Vehkalahti in present Hamina) is a Finnish rhythmic gymnast.

Lautala competed for Finland in the rhythmic gymnastics individual all-around competition at the 2000 Summer Olympics in Sydney. There she was 23rd in the qualification round and did not advance to the final.

References

External links 
 Heini Lautala at Sports-Reference.com

1977 births
Living people
Finnish rhythmic gymnasts
Gymnasts at the 2000 Summer Olympics
Olympic gymnasts of Finland
People from Hamina
Sportspeople from Kymenlaakso